"Somebody Lied" is a country music song written by Joe Chambers and Larry Jenkins. First recorded by Conway Twitty on his 1985 album Don't Call Him a Cowboy, it was later recorded by American country music singer Ricky Van Shelton. Shelton's version was released in July 1987 as the third single from his debut album Wild-Eyed Dream, as well as Shelton's first number-one single on the Hot Country Singles & Tracks chart.

Charts

Weekly charts

Year-end charts

References

1987 singles
1985 songs
Conway Twitty songs
Ricky Van Shelton songs
Song recordings produced by Steve Buckingham (record producer)
Columbia Records singles